The 1991 Furman Paladins football team was an American football team that represented Furman University as a member of the Southern Conference (SoCon) during the 1991 NCAA Division I-AA football season. In their sixth year under head coach Jimmy Satterfield, the Paladins compiled an overall record of 7–4 with a mark of 4–3 in conference play, finishing fourth in the SoCon.

Schedule

References

Furman
Furman Paladins football seasons
Furman Paladins football